HNLMS Vlissingen (M840) is the second ship in the City / Vlissingen-class of mine countermeasures vessels, and first to be built for the Royal Netherlands Navy.

History
Vlissingen is the result of a joint procurement programme for the replacements of the Tripartite- / Alkmaar-class minehunters for the Belgian- and Dutch navies.

She will be the second ship in the class behind  and the first for the Royal Netherlands Navy. She was laid down at Kership, Lorient, France on 14 June 2022, and is planned to be commissioned in 2025.

See also
 Future of the Royal Netherlands Navy

References

Mine warfare vessel classes
Minehunters of the Netherlands